The Acacia Demonstration Gardens is a public park in Henderson, Nevada that features many examples of how to landscape in a dry desert climate.  The park was built by the Conservation District Southern Nevada in coordination with the City of Henderson.

Demonstration Gardens

 Allergy Friendly Garden
 Cactus Garden
 Compost Demonstration Area
 Dry Wash Demonstration
 Ethnobotanical Garden
 Mediterranean Garden
 Native Garden
 Near Native Garden
 Outside Living and Entertaining Garden
 Small Yard Demonstration Gardens
 Streetscape Demonstration
 Tomi's Garden - In Memory of Nanyu Tomiyasu 
 Turf Demonstration Area
 Wildlife Friendly Garden

Other Features
Near the gardens are other park features, including:

 Water park playground for children
 Soccer field
 Baseball field
 Dog park

References

Gardens in Nevada
Geography of Henderson, Nevada
Dog parks in the United States
Protected areas of Clark County, Nevada